Baby Blues is an American comic strip created and produced by Rick Kirkman and Jerry Scott since January 7, 1990.  Distributed by King Features Syndicate from 1995 until January 2022, and distributed by Andrews McMeel Syndication as of January 2022, the strip focuses on the MacPherson family and specifically on the raising of the three MacPherson children.

When the strip debuted, the MacPherson family consisted of Darryl and Wanda and newborn Zoe. The first strip took place in the hospital room shortly after Zoe was born. Later, two more children—Hammie, the middle child and the only son, and Wren, the youngest child—were added to the family. Both Kirkman and Scott have drawn from their own parenting experiences as a source for the strip's content.

Characters and story
The strip features three families. The MacPhersons are the main focus. Butch and Bunny together with Yolanda and Mike make occasional appearances.

Main family (MacPhersons)
 Darryl MacPherson: The father. Age: Mid-30s. His job title is Senior Western Regional Assistant Director of Limited Budgetary Integration and Planning. Noticeable with his large nose. He is sometimes unaware of his wife's exhausted state. In various strips, Zoe, Wren and Hammie wait to meet him right when he gets home from work. In some strips, he appears to dislike a kids' show called "The Whistling Monkey Cowboy Band". One example is while Wren is obsessed with the merchandise, Wanda jokingly states that Bill Murray and Robin Williams have recently finished working on a "Whistling Monkey Cowboy Band" movie whereupon Darryl retreats to the roof. He also tends to swear when accidentally injuring himself or frustrated which Wren repeats in some strips. He also tends to make mistakes, such as in Wren's ultrasound, he mistakes her for a boy. He has red hair, and is an only child.
 Wanda MacPherson (nee Wizowski): The mother. Age: 36. Though she originally had a job as a public relations executive, she chose to become a stay-at-home mother after Zoe was born. However, she becomes frustrated and jealous of the women she regards as better mothers. She is afraid of snakes. She is sometimes upset with her children but still loves them. She often springs into action without thinking twice, such as when she saw a woman hit her child in the middle of the grocery store and promptly intervened whereupon she got into a major scuffle with the woman in question. She later wondered if she did the right thing or not.
 Zoe MacPherson: The oldest sibling (name pronounced   ) (first appearance January 7, 1990; her birth starts the strip), age: 9. She tends to fuss the most over what Wanda does. She likes to blame things on Hammie a lot, even when she was the one who actually did something wrong. She is also a major tattletale, to the point of getting withdrawal over it. Originally, her middle name was Jennifer, but a strip dated April 9, 2007, identified her middle name as Madison. Zoe is not usually a brat but an average child. This is represented when she is shown playing with toys, watching children's shows, playing with other children, and not having a clear view of the world earlier on in the strip. She, Hammie, and Wren do not have any known cousins because the only aunt they have is single and has no kids. At one point early on, she was a huge fan of Barbie, though her ideas about how she is a fan of Barbie vary between wanting to become a real life Barbie when she grows up (with Barbie related items) or basically using her to beat up her toys while pretending that she's some sort of monstrous freak (the latter of which was because of Wanda referring to Barbie as a "freak of nature"). She has a teddy bear named Christina Candle Flower Sparkle Jelly Bean Kissy Mooch.
 Hamish MacPherson: The middle sibling, usually called Hammie (first appearance April 29, 1995), age: 7,. He has great fondness and uninhibited enthusiasm for trucks, and can tell their model by sight, as proven in several strips. He has freckles and his hair is black like his mom's. He is the only MacPherson child who isn't a redhead. He did not have freckles until the June 14, 2006 strip. His first words were "buh-dozer" and "bazooka," much to Wanda's dismay. He often likes to tell Wanda or sometimes Darryl when Zoe teases or bullies him, but generally he gets mad less often than Zoe. He also likes annoying Zoe or watching her get into trouble (without doing anything himself). He was named after his great-great-grandfather, who was called "Ham". His teddy bear is called Twuck.
 Wren MacPherson: The youngest sibling (first appearance October 26, 2002), age: 2. She does not seem to be as much of a nuisance as her older siblings. Wren is a very curious baby. She often is shown climbing on top of things or grabbing at things. She said her first words (First "ma", then "da" and eventually "no") on Monday, May 19, 2008. Wanda explained that she thought of her name when a bird collided with a window during breakfast time in the hospital. As of February 16, 2009, Wren is officially able to stand. She has also learned the words "up", "down", and "%*@#! cramp" (from her dad). She has shown an annoyance several times to her parents by holding her legs completely stiff so they couldn't change her diaper. More recently, she had her first birthday. On September 27, 2014, she has grown a full head of hair instead of a hair tuft. Her eyes are less wide than the other MacPhersons. She has a teddy bear called Mr. Woogles.

Additional characters
  Butch and Bunny: Bunny and her seeming perfection in terms of appearance and lifestyle is the target of any possible jealousy from Wanda. Nearly all main adult characters dislike Bunny and have frequently tricked her in some way or another. Bunny seems to be oblivious to how she irritates Wanda, or anyone else around her. She is similarly oblivious to the needs of others and thereby often comes off as self-centered and tactless. Bunny has a husband, Butch. Together, they have three sons: Bogart (the oldest), and identical twins Wendell John and Wendell Jon. The latter two were born August 10, 2002. In one strip, Zoe has said that when Bunny is not looking, she shuffles the twins, which proves that even Bunny cannot tell the difference between the two. Bunny once commented that she would buy identical twin goldfish for Wendell John and Wendell Jon when they get older. After a long absence from the strip, Bunny returned where it was revealed that she and Butch had a divorce and now has full custody of Bogart and the Wendells.
 Yolanda and Mike: Yolanda and her husband, Mike, are close friends to the MacPhersons. Together, they have two daughters: Keesha and Dziko (nickname "Dizzy"), the latter of whom was born November 11, 2002.
 Rhonda Wizowski:  Wanda's younger sister. Enjoys the life of being a single woman, except when given a hard time about not "having children and settling down" by her mother. She usually shows up as the babysitter when Wanda and Darryl go out and leave their children behind. She is sometimes even tricked into babysitting for them. Recently, she is shown wanting to find a partner and start a family. In one series of strips she is shown to have an online relationship with  gentleman  named Thom, who called her Linda (He said "I love you, Linda") and caused her to throw wine at her computer; she broke up with him.
 Hugh and Maggie Wizowski: Wanda's parents.
 "Mac" and Pauline MacPherson: Darryl's parents. Darryl gets his big nose from Mac.
 Keesha: Zoe's best friend and neighbor. She has medium skin and black hair in braids and is about the same age as Zoe. 
 Dziko: Keesha's younger sister and Yolanda and Mike's youngest daughter who is a toddler like Wren. She doesn't appear as often as her parents and older sister. Her eyes are less wide and more circle shaped like Wren's.
 Trent: Best friend of Hammie since kindergarten. He and Hammie like to do many weird things together (especially to annoy Zoe). Another character of the same name has appeared as a friend of Zoe on May 6, 1997.
 Bogart: The oldest son of Butch and Bunny. He is Zoe's age, which is currently 9 years old and he has short black hair.
 Ashley: Ashley is one of Zoe's friends who has black hair. She has an unnamed pet gerbil and is an only child according to Zoe. In her first appearance, June 20, 2007, Ashley makes it clear that she is a snobby rich girl (i.e.; saying that the MacPhersons' house was small, asking Zoe if they picked the wall colors for the house, thinking Wanda was the maid). In both the first and last comic strips of the story, Zoe admits her reason for inviting Ashley was so that Wanda and Darryl would appreciate how nice she is.
 Mr. Doyle: Zoe and Keesha's teacher.
 Dr. Joseph: Dr. Joseph is the MacPhersons' doctor who has blonde hair and a big nose similar to Darryl's.
 Bethany is a friend of Zoe, who is never seen or heard and is only mentioned by Zoe. She threw a boy-girl party and for some reason did not invite Zoe.
 Bryan Barge is a boy in Zoe's class who was first mentioned by Zoe on March 5, 2011, as the boy she likes, but does not know she exists. She is in bed because this was part of a story where she is sick. He has never appeared in the comic and was only mentioned by several characters in the strip. He is one of the few characters besides the MacPhersons and Wizowskis that have a known last name.

Cameo appearances
 26 November 2022: Sally Brown and Snoopy

Timeline
The children in Baby Blues have aged as the strip has progressed, although at a slower rate than real-time. Kirkman and Scott have stated that the strip's timeline is "about a 3 to 1 ratio." As of 2021, Zoe, Hammie and Wren are 9, 7, and 2 respectively.

Books

Scrapbooks 

The first three Scrapbooks in the list below were not labelled "scrapbook" and didn't get a number, but they can be assumed to be number 1, 2 and 3 in that series because in the time line they precede number 4 of the Scrapbooks, and all of these books follow the same concept, i.e. they are collections of Baby Blues strips from the newspapers.
Starting with Scrapbook 30, the books come in a larger format and contain more strips. Scrapbooks are paperbacks.

Treasuries 

Treasuries are collections / compilations from strips in the Scrapbooks. Almost all of the Treasuries are paperbacks, just one is a hardcover (marked as "HC" here below).

Other collections / compilations 

These two books are not labelled "treasuries", but follow a similar concept, i.e. they also repeat strips from the Scrapbooks, but emphasize a specific topic (school; the relationship between Darryl and Wanda). They are paperbacks.

Gift Books 

These books are collections / compilations similar to the Treasuries, but the Gift Books are smaller in size and come as hardcovers.

Television adaptation 

Baby Blues was adapted into an animated television series for The WB. The animated version's timeline was from when Darryl and Wanda first gave birth to Zoe. Mike O'Malley supplied the voice of Darryl while Julia Sweeney played Wanda.

The first eight episodes of Baby Blues originally aired on The WB from July 28 to August 24, 2000, before being canceled. The five remaining episodes from the first season eventually aired on Adult Swim in 2002. A second season, consisting of 13 episodes, was produced but never aired.

The television series differed from the comic strip by focusing on Darryl and Wanda's relationship with the Bittermans, a neighbor family with three children (Rodney, Megan, and Shelby); Kenny, Darryl's co-worker; and Bizzy, the babysitter for Zoe. Rick Kirkman and Jerry Scott had only minimal creative control over the television series.

The theme song was "It's All Been Done" by the Barenaked Ladies.

Foreign versions

Baby Blues has been translated into French and German. This strip appeared in Canadian French-language newspapers on January 14, 2006.

References

External links 
Baby Blues at GoComics
Baby Blues at Don Markstein's Toonopedia. Archived from the original on February 22, 2018.

American comic strips
1990 comics debuts
Comics about married people
Child characters in comics
Gag-a-day comics
Comics adapted into animated series
Comics adapted into television series